General elections were held in Denmark on 9 January 1975. The result was a victory for the Social Democratic Party, who won 53 of the 179 seats. Voter turnout was 88% in Denmark proper, 56% in the Faroe Islands and 69% in Greenland.

Political parties
The Soviet Union covertly funded the Communist Party of Denmark.

Results

References

Elections in Denmark
Denmark
General election
Danish general election